The National Gas Turbine Establishment (NGTE Pyestock) in Farnborough, part of the Royal Aircraft Establishment (RAE), was the prime site in the UK for design and development of gas turbine and jet engines. It was created by merging the design teams of Frank Whittle's Power Jets and the RAE turbine development team run by Hayne Constant. NGTE spent most of its lifetime as a testing and development centre, both for experimental developments and to support commercial engine companies.

The newly merged venture was nationalised. Pyestock, a former golf course in a secluded wooded spot between Farnborough and Fleet was chosen as the turbine development site, as the activities at the NGTE would be top secret and the surrounding woodland would dampen the noise. Construction began in 1949 with small test "cubicles" inside buildings like the Plant House. When the possibility of supersonic jets arose, the site was expanded to the north west, with the Air House and several large test cells built circa 1961.

For over 50 years Pyestock was at the forefront of gas turbine development. It was probably the largest site of its kind in the world. V bomber, Harrier and Tornado engines were tested on site. The power of the air house allowed Concorde's engines to be tested at 2,000 mph. Every gas turbine installed in Royal Navy ships was checked here; captured Soviet engines were discreetly examined.

NGTE Pyestock closed down in 2000 and was decommissioned to make way for a new housing village, Hartland Village.

History
In 1942 the Royal Aircraft Establishment (RAE) Turbine Division moved to new facilities in Pyestock. In 1944 Power Jets Ltd. (set up by Frank Whittle and two colleagues in 1936) merged with the RAE Turbine Division and was nationalised to form Power Jets (Research and Development) Ltd. In 1946 it was reconstituted as a division of the Ministry of Supply to form the National Gas Turbine Establishment.

The Admiralty Marine Engineering Establishment (formerly the Admiralty Fuel Experimental Station which developed the Admiralty three-drum boiler) was taken over by the NGTE in 1965.

Following the 1971 creation of the Ministry of Defence Procurement Executive, both the Admiralty Engineering Laboratory (1917-1977) and the Admiralty Oil Laboratory (1953-1977) were amalgamated with the NGTE. In 1995 the establishment became part of DERA. The establishment closed in 2000.

The Buildings

Air House 
The Air House (1961) was a modernistic structure. Its eastern side is sheet glass; 8 large blue exhaust pipes rise the full length of the building, for the 8 compressor/exhauster sets inside. The pipes transported the fast moving air to/from the test cells.

The Air House had two functions: blowing or sucking air, at up to 2,000 mph (for Cell 4). There were eight identical GEC compressor/exhauster sets which aggregated to 352,000 horsepower, then the largest installation of its kind in the western world.

This is the final design for the compressor/exhauster sets from the late 1950s. They are made up of an in-line arrangement (from left to right) of an 8,000 horsepower steam turbine, then two low-pressure compressors, a high-pressure exhauster, a 27 MW 11 kV synchronous motor that provided 36,000 horsepower, and finally the barring gear and the exciter (a small generator that provides a current needed to start the main motor).

The 8,000 horsepower steam turbine, which was powered by the site's boiler house, gave the compressor sets a kick start before it was synced with the grid. They could also be used whilst they were being run, but this was expensive and only used on the supersonic tests.

Cell 3 

Cell 3 was mostly underground and was a supersonic replacement of Cell 2, allowing for higher speeds and a greater engine temperature range. There was a fairly large building above ground. But that was just to allow engines to be lowered into the test chamber from a huge crane. The test chamber itself was almost entirely underground.

Cell 3 West 
Cell 3 West was a comparatively small building, with a large blue and white round opening on the front of the test chamber. It was the last altitude test cell built on site. It was one of the largest cells internally, allowing icing tests (testing to see how ice affects a turbine's performance) to be carried out on engines and helicopter rotors. The engine or turbine was suspended from the roof of the cell.

Cell 4 

The largest test cell on site, Cell 4 was built in 1965, at a cost of £6.5 million, as part of the Concorde programme but also to test other supersonic jet engines. The test cell, unique in the world, takes up most of the steel clad structure with its mass of pipes, blast doors and electronics. It is connected to the Air House by blue pipes and was designed to simulate Concorde's flying conditions - Mach 2 (1522 mph) at 61,000 feet, but could test Concorde's engines at a maximum wind speed of 2,000 mph.

The amount of energy required to run the air house (see below) at the speed needed was too great for the site's own power station, so electricity had to be taken from the National Grid. By the early 1970s, Pyestock had to negotiate with the Central Electricity Generating Board (CEGB) to have enough electricity generated. So as not to strain the grid, Cell 4 could only be powered up at night.

Number 9 Exhauster 

Pyestock's designers built the Air House on a large scale, thinking it could supply adequate suction for the supersonic test cells. But they could not have anticipated the phenomenal force required by Cell 4 - even with all eight exhausters running the suction was insufficient. The solution was to build another exhauster set directly next to Cell 4. As there are eight in the Air House, this one was named number 9.

It is a Parsons "multi-stage axial-flow exhauster". It was used mainly by Cell 4 but also occasionally by Cell 3 and Cell 3 West. It was driven by a 36,000 horsepower synchronous motor, with power being taken first from the site's power station, and then when 3,000 rpm was reached it was synchronised with the National Grid.

Filmography
Pyestock was used for several scenes in the 2005 film Sahara by Breck Eisner, based on the best-selling book of the same name by Clive Cussler. Internal sections of Cell 3 and Cell 4 were suitably reworked for the film's supposedly solar powered waste disposal facility.

See also
 List of wind tunnels

References

External links 
 Pyestock, the National Gas Turbine Establishment
 Information and photos from an ex employee
 Exploring NGTE Pyestock
 Booklet documenting the Pyestock services from ~1982
 Site in 2011
 "Gas Turbine Development" an excerpt from a Hayne Constant lecture in a 1957 issue of Flight - Part 1
 "Gas Turbine Development" an excerpt from a Hayne Constant lecture in a 1957 issue of Flight - Part 2
 "Open Days at the NGTE" a 1966 Flight article

History of science and technology in the United Kingdom
Military research establishments of the United Kingdom
Military history of Hampshire
Fleet, Hart